Colony is a town in northeastern Washita County, Oklahoma, United States. The population was 136 at the 2010 U.S. census, a decrease of 7.5 percent from 147 in 2000. It was named for the Seger Colony, founded in 1886, which taught modern agricultural techniques to the Arapaho and Cheyenne tribes that would be resettled in the vicinity.

History
John Seger, a native of Ohio and a Union veteran of the Civil War, was hired in 1872 to work as a mason/carpenter to build housing and other structures for a school for Native American children at the Darlington Agency. Later, he began a colony for Native Americans with Arapaho Indians, who were joined later by a number of Cheyennes. By the following year, Seger's colony had over 500 inhabitants. Seger began teaching modern agricultural methods as well as brick-making. By 1892, the colony had also built an industrial arts school, with the Native Americans  providing the bricks and cutting stone for all the buildings.

William De Lestinier opened a store near the school with government permission, even before the Land Run of 1892. De Lestinier moved his store to the new site. In 1895, the Dutch Reformed Church founded a mission at the colony. In 1896, a new post office named Colony opened, and the town took that name.

Colony continued to grow and had an estimated population of 300 by 1911. The Dutch Reformed mission closed in 1912 and the Seger Indian school closed in 1932.

Geography
Colony is located at  (35.3510, -98.6733) in Seger Township (T10N R14W), Washita County, Oklahoma.

Demographics

As of the census of 2000, there were 147 people, 64 households, and 49 families residing in the town. There were 79 housing units at an average density of 84.2 per square mile (32.4/km2). The racial makeup of the town was 80.27% White, 10.20% Native American, 4.76% from other races, and 4.76% from two or more races. Hispanic or Latino of any race were 5.44% of the population.

There were 64 households, out of which 28.1% had children under the age of 18 living with them, 71.9% were married couples living together, 4.7% had a female householder with no husband present, and 21.9% were non-families. 20.3% of all households were made up of individuals, and 14.1% had someone living alone who was 65 years of age or older. The average household size was 2.30 and the average family size was 2.62.

In the town, the population was spread out, with 21.1% under the age of 18, 2.7% from 18 to 24, 21.8% from 25 to 44, 26.5% from 45 to 64, and 27.9% who were 65 years of age or older. The median age was 48 years. For every 100 females, there were 96.0 males. For every 100 females age 18 and over, there were 93.3 males.

The median income for a household in the town was $26,912, and the median income for a family was $27,426. Males had a median income of $26,071 versus $16,250 for females. The per capita income for the town was $18,106. There were 15.1% of families and 17.2% of the population living below the poverty line, including 23.5% of under eighteens and 21.6% of those over 64.

Notable people
 Yvonne Kauger, a Justice of the Oklahoma State Supreme Court, grew up in Colony and graduated from high school there.
 Dale Mitchell, two-time Major League Baseball All-Star outfielder for the Cleveland Indians and Brooklyn Dodgers.

See also
 Darlington Agency
 John Homer Seger

References

External links
 Encyclopedia of Oklahoma History and Culture - Colony

Towns in Oklahoma
Towns in Washita County, Oklahoma
Populated places established in 1892
1892 establishments in Oklahoma Territory